A numeric keypad, number pad, numpad, or ten key,
is the palm-sized, usually-17-key section of a standard computer keyboard, usually on the far right. It provides calculator-style efficiency for entering numbers. The idea of a 10-key number pad cluster was originally introduced by Tadao Kashio, the developer of Casio electronic calculators. 

Laptop keyboards often do not have a numpad, but may provide numpad input by holding a modifier key (typically labelled ) and operating keys on the standard keyboard. Particularly large laptops (typically those with a 15.6 inch screen or larger) may have space for a real numpad, and many companies sell separate numpads which connect to the host laptop by a USB connection (many of these also add an additional spacebar off to the side of the zero where the thumb is located, as well as an additional  key typical of modern adding machines and cash registers. Some specialist numpads may also include an additional  key).

Sometimes it is necessary to distinguish between a key on the numpad and an equivalent key elsewhere on the keyboard. For example, depending on the software in use, pressing the numpad's  key may produce different results than pressing the alphanumeric  key. In such cases, the numpad-specific key may be indicated as e.g. , 

Numeric keypads usually operate in two modes. When  is on, digit keys produce the corresponding digit.

The arrangement of digits on numeric keypads with the -- keys two rows above the -- keys is  derived from calculators and cash registers. It is notably different from the layout of telephone Touch-Tone keypads which have the -- keys on top and -- keys on the third row.

Numeric keypads are useful for entering long sequences of numbers quickly, for example in spreadsheets, financial/accounting programs, and calculators. Input in this style is similar to a calculator or adding machine.

Technically, the previous example's method using a leading  (ANSI alt code) only works when used with the numpad's own keys, so it could be written less ambiguously (if necessary) using one of the notations mentioned above, e.g. . When entering a hex Unicode value, only the leading '+' needs to be the  key, so this notation can be used sparingly, e.g.  yields ě.

To maintain their compact size, Mac laptops and most PC notebooks do not include a Numeric Keypad. To compensate it, most PCs include   integrated into a function key (typically  or ) and then press keys like  to produce a NumPad 7, although some PC notebooks do not include such shortcuts.

Measuring speed 
Ten key speed is measured in Keystrokes per Hour (KPH). The minimum required speed for many data entry jobs is around 9000 KPH with good accuracy. A speed of 12,000 is considered excellent.

Chinese input methods 

The numeric keypad is used by some systems for input of Chinese characters, for example CKC Chinese Input System and Q9 input method.

Computer games and mousing alternative

Numeric keypads are also used for playing some computer games where the player must control a character, for example roguelikes. Unlike arrow keys, the numeric keypad allows diagonal movement. For keyboards without a numeric keypad, some games provide alternative movement keys, such as classic Rogue's HJKL keys.

The numeric keypad can also be an alternative to the WASD keys for navigation in computer gaming. This can be an attractive option for left-handed people who prefer to use the mouse with their left hand.

Most operating systems have a mouse keys accessibility feature where mouse navigation can be done using the numeric keypad, with the other keys adapted to be mouse buttons.

See also 

 Alphonse Chapanis

Notes

References 

Computer keys